Leucopogon setiger is a shrub from eastern Australia. It grows between 0.3 and 1.5 metres tall. It grows in eucalyptus forest on sandstone based soils, and sometimes in mallee heath in wetter areas. Most often recorded from near Sydney and the Blue Mountains.  This plant features delicate white bell shaped flowers. Leaves are up to 12 mm long, 2 to 4 mm wide. The fruit is in the shape of an ellipse, around 4.2 mm long. Yellowish green, dry and hairless.

The specific epithet setiger is from Latin, and it refers to the “bristly”, short pointed leaves. This plant first appeared in the scientific literature in 1810, in the Prodromus Florae Novae Hollandiae, authored by the prolific Scottish botanist, Robert Brown.

References

setiger
Ericales of Australia
Flora of New South Wales
Plants described in 1810